Concrete Roots is a compilation album containing songs produced by Dr. Dre, released in 1994. The album was conceived and compiled by Lee "DJ Flash" Johnson. The album peaked at No. 43 on the Billboard 200.

Critical reception
Trouser Press wrote: "With the exception of Michel’le’s smooth kiss-off 'No More Lies,' the mostly sub-B-side cuts are a weak mix of filler and watered-down, post-disco rap from Dre and Yella’s pre-N.W.A outfit, the oft-ridiculed and ridiculously attired World Class Wreckin’ Cru’."

Vibe gave the compilation a mixed review, writing that it puts Dre's early work in "proper context" and "historical perspective." It also praised the D.O.C.'s contributions.

Track listing

Charts

Credits
Peter Heur - Executive Producer 
DJ Flash - Executive Producer 
The World Class Wreckin' Cru - Performer 
Dr. Dre - Arranger, Drums, Vocals, Producer, Main Performer, Keyboards, Drum Programming 
Dean Naleway - Executive Producer 
Yvette Clark Art - Direction, Design 
William "Dr. Z." Zimmerman - Keyboards 
DJ Yella  - Programming, Producer 
Cli-N-Tel - Producer  
Stan Jones - Guitar 
Ice Cube - Vocals 
N.W.A - Vocals 
Leon Haywood - Performer 
Victor Brooks - Remixing 
Lonzo - Associate Producer, Executive Producer, Remixing 
Derrell Black - Vocals 
Wreckin' Cru - Executive Producer   
Eazy-E - Vocals 
Billy Jam Liner - Notes 
MC Ren - Vocals 
Monalisa Young - Vocals (Background)

References

External links
Dre2001.com

Dr. Dre albums
Albums produced by Dr. Dre
1994 compilation albums
Triple X Records compilation albums
Hip hop compilation albums
Compilation albums by American artists